Five Ways of Disappearing is an album by the American musician Kendra Smith, released in 1995. It marked a full-album return to music for Smith, who for much of the 1990s had been tending to her northern California organic farm. Smith did not do a lot of promotion for the album, and chose not to tour nationally behind it.

Production
The album was produced by Smith and A. Phillip Uberman. Many of its songs were constructed around the use of a pump organ; others used Turkish drums and harmonium. On some songs, Smith randomly arranged words to form the lyrics, and used multitracked vocals.

"Bold Marauder" is a cover of the Mimi and Richard Farina song.

Critical reception

Entertainment Weekly wrote: "Spare and haunting, the eerie keyboards and varied guitar textures drape the songs’ slow tempos and rustic melodies, while Smith’s cool vocals deliver elusive, psychedelic lyrics." Trouser Press called "Bold Marauder" "one of the best acoustic Led Zeppelin imitations in recent memory," and wrote that "though some songs are amiss, precious or overly derivative, as a personal sampler, Five Ways of Disappearing is an impressive—and colorful—achievement." Rolling Stone determined that "when Smith resigns the organ to a background role and matches her voice's fine edge to the guitar's slightly spacey effects, the results are down to earth and memorable."

Robert Christgau thought that "with the pump organ and all she does have Her Own Sound, especially if you don't remember Nico too clearly—and unlike Nico, she also has a sense of humor." Spin deemed it "a songwriter's album, in the style of Brian Eno's Taking Tiger Mountain (By Strategy) ... Each package of lyrics is showcased inside of a specific set of instrumental routines." The Knoxville News Sentinel concluded that the album "drags listeners into semi-consciousness two ways: sometimes entrancing with atmosphere, sometimes with lulling tedium."

AllMusic wrote that Smith's "deadpan vocal delivery adds another layer of individuality to an offbeat album by an offbeat artist." Don McLeese, of the Austin American-Statesman, listed Five Ways of Disappearing as the 4th best album of 1995; Miami New Times also included it on a list of the year's 10 best.

Track listing

References

1995 albums
4AD albums